Markus Ringberg (born 5 May 1976) is a Swedish football player who plays for IL Express.

Club career
He was born in Mjällby.

His most notable achievements came at his time in Fredrikstad FK where he was one of the main contributors in taking the club from the Norwegian Second Division to the Norwegian Premier League in just two seasons. After scoring a brace of goals in the campaign for reinstatement in the premiership he was named captain of the side for two seasons in the Norwegian top flight.

He was sold to Hamarkameratene in the summer of 2005. This caused some FFK fans to come together in a 200-man strong demonstration outside the FFK's clubhouse demanding the heads of those responsible for the controversial sale of Ringberg. Ringberg himself wept at the press conference where he announced his departure from the club. Although his scoring prowess was not at its peak during his last two seasons with FFK he still remains one of the club's strongest former players.

He later joined Moss FK. In mid-2010 he joined Kvik Halden FK.

Career statistics

References

1976 births
Living people
Swedish footballers
Fredrikstad FK players
Hamarkameratene players
Moss FK players
Kvik Halden FK players
Expatriate footballers in Norway
Swedish expatriate footballers
Swedish expatriate sportspeople in Norway
Norwegian First Division players
Norwegian Third Division players
Norwegian Fourth Division players
Eliteserien players
Association football forwards